James Hutchison Hoy, Baron Hoy  (21 January 1909 – 7 August 1976) was a Scottish Labour politician and life peer.

Educated at Causewayside and Sciennes Public Schools, Edinburgh, he initially worked as an interior decorator. He was elected as Labour Member of Parliament for Leith at the 1945 general election, holding the seat until 1970. He served as Parliamentary Private Secretary to the Secretary of State for Scotland from 1947 to 1950, and was joint Parliamentary Secretary to the Ministry of Agriculture, Fisheries and Food from 1964 to 1970. He was appointed vice-president of the Trustee Savings Bank Association in 1957.

He was appointed a Privy Counsellor in 1969. On 4 July 1970 following his retirement from the House of Commons, he was created a life peer as Baron Hoy, of Leith in the County of the City of Edinburgh. He died in 1976 aged 67.

See also
Who Was Who

References

1909 births
1976 deaths
Scottish Labour MPs
Labour Party (UK) life peers 
Members of the Privy Council of the United Kingdom
UK MPs 1945–1950
UK MPs 1950–1951
UK MPs 1951–1955
UK MPs 1955–1959
UK MPs 1959–1964
UK MPs 1964–1966
UK MPs 1966–1970
UK MPs who were granted peerages
Members of the Parliament of the United Kingdom for Edinburgh constituencies
Ministers in the Wilson governments, 1964–1970
Life peers created by Elizabeth II